The Department of Public Works of the Government of Nova Scotia is responsible for transportation, communications, construction, property, and accommodation of government departments and agencies in the province. 

Kim Masland is its current minister. The department has over 2,000 employees responsible for implementing its mandate.

History
The department was established in 1918 as the Department of Highways. In 1926, the Provincial Highway Board was abolished, and the Department of Highways took up responsibility for road building, traffic management, as well as tourism.

In 1939, the department assumed responsibility for government property, and was renamed Department of Highways and Public Works. It was renamed Department of Transportation in 1979.

It was renamed several times thereon, to Transportation and Communications (1987); Transportation and Public Works (1996), when it absorbed functions of the former Department of Supply and Services; and Transportation and Infrastructure Renewal (2007).

In early 2021, the then-Department of Transportation and Infrastructure Renewal (TIR) was renamed to Department of Transportation and Active Transit (TAT). After the election of the Houston government in 2021, the department was given its present name.

Operational Units
 Highway operations
 Public Works division
 Real property services
 Government Services division
 Government service's corporate IT operations
 Corporate Policy branch
 Corporate Services branch
 Public Safety Communications Services Program Office
 Environmental services
 Trucking
Truck regulatory review
Vehicle compliance
B-Train routes

Responsibilities
The Department of Transportation and Infrastructure Renewal is responsible for:
23,000 kilometres of road including the Cobequid Pass
4,100 bridges except those under the Halifax Dartmouth Bridge Commission
200 steel truss bridges
800 pieces of equipment
 7  ferries
53 garages
 5 scale houses
 44 Road Weather Information Systems and highway cameras
 Manages the Dangerous Goods Transportation Act, which regulates the transportation of dangerous goods such as chemicals, hazardous waste and explosives
 Public safety radio services
Nova Scotia Integrated Mobile Radio System (NSIMRS)
Trunked Mobile Radio System (TMRS)

Former Departments
Transportation and Public Works to October 23, 2007
Transportation and Communications
Department of Highways 
Department of Public Works
Department of Communications

See also
List of Nova Scotia provincial highways
Transport Canada

References

External links
 Home Page
Management of Road Salt Usage in Nova Scotia

1918 establishments in Nova Scotia
Public Works
Nova Scotia